Progress M-55, identified by NASA as Progress 20P, was a Progress spacecraft used to resupply the International Space Station. It was a Progress-M 11F615A55 spacecraft, with the serial number 355.

Launch
Progress M-55 was launched by a Soyuz-U carrier rocket from Site 1/5 at the Baikonur Cosmodrome. Launch occurred at 18:38:20 UTC on 21 December 2005.

Docking
The spacecraft docked with the Pirs module at 19:46:18 UTC on 23 December 2005. It remained docked for almost 179 days before undocking at 14:06:01 UTC on 19 June 2006 to make way for Progress M-57. It was deorbited at 17:06:01 UTC on 19 June 2006. The spacecraft burned up in the atmosphere over the Pacific Ocean, with any remaining debris landing in the ocean at around 17:53:14 UTC.

Progress M-55 carried supplies to the International Space Station, including food, water and oxygen for the crew and equipment for conducting scientific research.

See also

 List of Progress flights
 Uncrewed spaceflights to the International Space Station

References

2005 in spaceflight
Progress (spacecraft) missions
Spacecraft which reentered in 2006
Supply vehicles for the International Space Station
Spacecraft launched by Soyuz-U rockets